Aspasia was an Athenian woman and a friend of Pericles.

Aspasia may also refer to:
 Aspasia (journal), a journal of gender history
 Aspasia (plant), an orchid genus
 Aspásia, a city in São Paulo state, Brazil
 Aspasia Cruvellier Mirault (1800–1857), an American planter and landowner
 Aspasia Manos (1896–1972), wife of Alexander of Greece and the only modern Greek royal consort not styled as Queen
 Aspazija (1865–1943), Latvian poet and playwright
 Aspasia, the name of both the wife and daughter of Artaxerxes II of Persia
 Aspasia the Physician (fl. 1st century), ancient Greek physician who worked in obstetrics and gynecology